Hedwig Leenaert (28 November 1931 – 19 June 2017) was a Belgian long-distance runner. He competed in the men's 5000 metres at the 1960 Summer Olympics.

References

1931 births
2017 deaths
Athletes (track and field) at the 1960 Summer Olympics
Belgian male long-distance runners
Olympic athletes of Belgium
Place of birth missing